Fugitive in the Sky (aka Heroes of the Air) is a 1936 American aviation drama film directed by Nick Grinde and written by George Bricker. The stars are Jean Muir, Warren Hull, Gordon Oliver, Carlyle Moore Jr., Howard Phillips, Winifred Shaw and Mary Treen. Fugitive in the Sky was released by Warner Bros. on November 28, 1936, a mere six months after the Paramount Pictures feature, 13 Hours by Air, considered by aviation film historian Michael Paris in From the Wright Brothers to Top Gun: Aviation, Nationalism, and Popular Cinema (1995), as a virtual "remake" of the earlier film.

The Foreword at the end of opening credits stated:"The story portrayed in this production is fictitious, and is not intended to represent events which have taken place on a commercial air line ... Scheduled air transport, regulated by the Department of Commerce, is today recognized as a fast and safe form of transportation."

Plot
In Los Angeles, air hostess Rita Moore (Jean Muir) chats with her suitor, reporter Terry Brewer (Warren Hull), as passengers check in for a flight to New York.  Brewer recognizes federal agent Mike Phelan (John Litel) traveling incognito. Guessing Phelan will be after "Killer" Madsen, wanted for murder, Brewer phones his editor for permission and boards the aircraft as well, to the annoyance of pilot Bob White (Gordon Oliver), another suitor of Rita's.  The Ford Trimotor now has a full load of 12 passengers.

At a stop in Albuquerque, passenger Katie Tristo (Nedda Harrigan), who generally talks about nothing but astrology, buys an Indian-made dagger from a souvenir stand. Between there and the next stop in Kansas City, most of the passengers are dozing when someone uses this dagger to kill another passenger, Ramon Duval (Gordon Elliott).

When the crime is discovered, Phelan reveals his true identity and attempts to take charge, but instead a "female" passenger draws a gun, disarms and handcuffs Phelan, and hijacks the aircraft.  He removes his disguise: he is "Killer" Madsen. After the radio transmitter is disabled, he throws the pilots' guns out the cockpit window, and orders them to fly to Evansville, Indiana.  As they fly, Brewer interviews Madsen, who claims he never murdered anyone with a knife. If so, someone else must have committed this new murder.

Rita attempts to drug Madsen's coffee, but instead knocks out copilot Johnny Martin (Carlyle Moore Jr.). A dust storm arises and all aircraft are ordered to land. Madsen makes White fly until the dust stops the engines, forcing an emergency landing in Missouri. Madsen leaves the aircraft, ordering the other passengers and crew to give him a 10-minute start, and commandeers an elderly couple's farmhouse nearby. The others find the same house and are again taken hostage.

Eventually Madsen orders White to repair the engines and resume the flight. Brewer goes along to help, and while Madsen is watching White, he manages to repair the radio and call police as well as filing his news story. The other hostages are afraid enough of Madsen to remain in the house, which has no phone.

As they pass the time viewing anaglyph 3-D photos with a stereoscope, Rita realizes that Katie looks younger when seen through its red lens. Phelan then recognizes her as Katie Dorne, a second fugitive, disguised by red makeup. Rita finds a way to arm herself and goes to confront Madsen, but he uses Brewer as a shield and shoots White, wounding him.  Brewer then manages to overpower Madsen.
 fail
Phelan arrives, recovers his handcuff key, puts the cuffs on Madsen, and also arrests Dorne for murdering Duval. They had stolen $90,000 worth of bonds together, and Phelan had been following Duval to catch them both. She killed Duval because he had taken all the bonds. Madsen's presence on the same flight was coincidental.

White now assists with a smile as Brewer proposes to Rita; the two board the aircraft and begin kissing.

Cast     
 Jean Muir as Rita Moore
 Warren Hull as Terry Brewer
 Gordon Oliver as Bob White
 Carlyle Moore Jr. as Johnny Martin
 Howard Phillips as "Killer" Madsen
 Winifred Shaw as Autumn Day 
 Mary Treen as Agatha Ormsby
 with John Litel as Mike Phelan from Department of Justice
 Gordon Elliott as Ramon Duval, mustachioed passenger on the aircraft 
 Nedda Harrigan as Katie Tristo, passenger, astrology follower and disguised criminal who kills Ramon Duval
 John Kelly as Kid Couch, dimwitted boxer traveling on the aircraft
 Joe Cunningham as Spike, Kid Couch's trainer on the aircraft with Kid Couch
 Don Barclay as Ronald DeWitt, drunken passenger on the aircraft
 Charles Foy as Steve Fanning, another passenger on the aircraft 
 Spencer Charters as Henry Staeger, farmhouse owner who welcomes the aircraft passengers
 Lillian Harmer as Martha Staeger, Henry Staeger's wife
 Tom Jackson as Dave Brandon, city desk editor at Terry Brewer's newspaper

Production
A pre-release title and "working title" of Fugitive in the Sky was Heroes of the Air. Production on Fugitive in the Sky began in 1936, with location photography taking place at Alhambra Airport, California.

The aircraft used in Fugitive in the Sky were: 
 Ford Trimotor 4-ATB c/n 24, NC5578 
 Stinson SM-8A c/n 4024, NC215W 
 Fokker Super Universal

A studio mock-up of a Ford Trimotor's interior and cockpit was also used in Fugitive in the Sky.

Reception
Film reviewer Frank S. Nugent, writing in The New York Times considered that Fugitive in the Sky was a "... fairly interesting, if incredible, action picture". He further noted, "Without so much as a 'stop us if you've heard this one before', the Warners are blandly repeating the story of Paramount's 13 Hours by Air under a new title, "Fugitive in the Sky," which claimed sanctuary at the Palace yesterday ..."

Aviation film historian James H. Farmer in Celluloid Wings: The Impact of Movies on Aviation (1984) characterized Fugitive in the Sky as a "rather bland second feature rerun of Paramount's Thirteen Hours by Air (1936). All of the elements are here; the wanted killer, an airliner load of unsuspecting passengers, and, of course, the ever-present, life-threatening storm. Predictable results."

References

Notes

Citations

Bibliography

 Farmer, James H. Celluloid Wings: The Impact of Movies on Aviation (1st ed.). Blue Ridge Summit, Pennsylvania: TAB Books 1984. .
 Paris, Michael. From the Wright Brothers to Top Gun: Aviation, Nationalism, and Popular Cinema. Manchester, UK: Manchester University Press, 1995. .
 Pendo, Stephen. Aviation in the Cinema. Lanham, Maryland: Scarecrow Press, 1985. .
 Wynne, H. Hugh. The Motion Picture Stunt Pilots and Hollywood's Classic Aviation Movies. Missoula, Montana: Pictorial Histories Publishing Co., 1987. .

External links
 
 
 
 
 Fugitive in the Sky at TV Guide (1987 write-up was originally published in The Motion Picture Guide)

1936 films
1930s English-language films
Warner Bros. films
American drama films
1936 drama films
Films directed by Nick Grinde
American black-and-white films
American aviation films
1930s American films
English-language drama films